The 2014–15 Azerbaijan Cup was the 23rd season of the annual cup competition in Azerbaijan. The final of the cup has  been played on 3 June 2015.

First round
The First Round games were drawn on 15 October 2014.

Second round
The Two winners of the First Round will progress to the Second Round, which was drawn on 15 October 2014.

Quarterfinals
The eight winners from the Second Round are drawn into four two-legged ties.

Semifinals
The four winners from the Quarterfinals were drawn into two two-legged ties.

Final

Scorers
5 goals:
 Vüqar Nadirov, Qarabağ

4 goals:

 Dragan Ćeran, Simurq
 Reynaldo, Qarabağ

3 goals:
 Nicolás Canales, Neftchi Baku

2 goals:

 Bakhtiyar Soltanov, Gabala
 Arif Dashdemirov, Inter Baku
 Bachana Tskhadadze, Inter Baku
 Röyal Nəcəfov, MOIK Baku
 Ernest Nfor, Neftchi Baku
 Javid Taghiyev, Qarabağ

1 goal:

 Freddy Mombongo-Dues, AZAL
 Lasha Kasradze, AZAL
 Pavol Farkaš, Gabala
 Mirsahib Abbasov, Inter Baku
 Afran Ismayilov, Inter Baku
 Asif Mammadov, Inter Baku
 Elvin Mammadov, Inter Baku
 Mikel Álvaro, Inter Baku
 Räfael Qävami, MOIK Baku
 Mahammad Aliyev, Neftchala
 Ruslan Qurbanov, Neftchi Baku
 Denis Silva, Neftchi Baku
 Julius Wobay, Neftchi Baku
 Maksim Medvedev, Qarabağ
 Richard Almeida, Qarabağ
 Muarem Muarem, Qarabağ
 Innocent Emeghara, Qarabağ
 Ramil Nuriyev, Qaradağ
 Ali Gökdemir, Simurq
 Rashad Eyyubov, Simurq
 Benjamin Lambot, Simurq
 Stjepan Poljak, Simurq
 Marko Stanojević, Simurq

Own goals:
 Alfred Sankoh (4 March 2015 vs Inter Baku)

Notes
Qarabağ have played their home games at the Tofiq Bahramov Stadium since 1993 due to the ongoing situation in Quzanlı.
Following Araz-Naxçıvan's withdrawal from the Azerbaijan Premier League, Khazar Lankaran were awarded the victory.

References

Azerbaijan Cup seasons
Azerbaijan Cup
Azerbaijan Cup